The Helsinki Cup is an international youth football tournament, held each year in Helsinki, Finland during June/July. It was held for the first time in 1976.

External links
Official homepage.
2008 results.
2009 results.

International association football competitions hosted by Finland
Sports competitions in Helsinki
Youth football competitions
Youth football in Finland